Penamaluru mandal is one of the 25 mandals in Krishna district of the Indian state of Andhra Pradesh. Penamaluru Mandal is the major suburb of Vijayawada.It is under the administration of Vuyyuru revenue division and its headquarters are located at Penamaluru. The mandal lies on the banks of Krishna River and is bounded by Vijayawada (urban), Vijayawada (rural) and Kankipadu mandals. The mandal is also a part of the Andhra Pradesh Capital Region under the jurisdiction of APCRDA.

Demographics 

 census, the mandal had a population of 168,022. The total  
population constitute, 84,485 males and 83,537 females —a sex ratio of 989 females per 1000  
males. 15,682 children are in the age group of 0–6 years, of which 7,970 are boys and 7,712 are girls. The average literacy rate stands at 80.39% with 122,471 literates.

Administration 

The mandal has 10 settlements. It includes 1 out growths and 4 villages. Ganguru (OG) and Penamaluru (OG) are outgrowths to Vijayawada (M.Corp). On 23 March 2017, as per the G.O. 104 of Municipal Administration and Urban Developmwnt Department, Kanuru (CT), Poranki (CT), Penamaluru (OG), Tadigadapa (CT), Yanamalakuduru (CT) became a part of Vijayawada metropolitan area.

The following are towns and villages in the mandal:

Note: M.Corp.-Municipal Corporation, (CT)-Census town, OG-Out Growth

See also 
List of villages in Krishna district
Vijayawada revenue division

References

Mandals in Krishna district